The Campeonato Brasileiro de Basquete (English: Brazilian Basketball Championship) is the annual championship title of the top-tier level men's professional basketball league in Brazil. Over the years, the championship has been held under different leagues. From 1990 to 2008, the top-tier level league competition in Brazil also held the name of Campeonato Brasileiro de Basquete.

History

Taça Brasil de Basquete (1965–1989)
From 1965 to 1989, Brazil's top-tier level basketball championship was contested in the Taça Brasil de Basquete (Brazilian Basketball Cup) league. It was organized by the Brazilian Basketball Confederation (CBB). In 1990, it was replaced by the Campeonato Brasileiro de Basquete (Brazilian Basketball Championship).

Campeonato Nacional de Basquete (1990–2008)
From 1990 to 2008, Brazil's top-tier level basketball championship was contested in the Campeonato Brasileiro de Basquete (Brazilian Basketball Championship) league. It was organized by the Brazilian Basketball Confederation (CBB). The Campeonato Brasileiro had organizational problems, and in 2004, it was nicknamed the "Liga do Busão" ("bus league"), due to the team's transportation by bus, as the CBB wouldn't pay for it, and airplanes tickets were too expensive. In 2009, it was replaced by the Novo Basquete Brasil (NBB), organized by the Liga Nacional de Basquete (LNB).

Novo Basquete Brasil (2009–present)

Since 2009, Brazil's top-tier level basketball championship is contested in the Novo Basquete Brasil. The NBB is endorsed by the Brazilian Basketball Confederation), and is organized by the Liga Nacional de Basquete (LNB), in a new format of the Brazilian premier basketball league. The league is managed, for the first time, by 19 Brazilian basketball teams, all of which were LNB founding members.

Brazilian basketball champions

Taça Brasil de Basquete

 1965  Corinthians
 1966  Corinthians
 1967  Botafogo
 1968  Sírio
 1969  Corinthians
 1970  Sírio
 1971  Bagres/Franca
 1972  Sírio
 1973  Vila Nova
 1974  Emmanuel/Franca
 1975  Amazonas/Franca
 1976 Not held
 1977  Palmeiras
 1978  Sírio
 1979  Sírio
 1980  Francana
 1981 (I)  São José
 1981 (II)  Francana
 1982  Monte Líbano
 1983  Sírio
 1984–85  Monte Líbano
 1985–86  Monte Líbano
 1986  Monte Líbano
 1987  Monte Líbano
 1988–89  Sírio

Taça Brasil de Basquete Finals

Campeonato Nacional de Basquete
From 2002 on, most teams have their names with the sponsor first. In 1992, and from 1996 to 2000, the sponsor is the latter name.

Novo Basquete Brasil

Titles by club
Including all four league formats, the Taça Brasil de Basquete, the Campeonato Brasileiro de Basquete, the Nossa Liga de Basquete (unofficial), and the Novo Basquete Brasil (NBB).

By team

By state

Players with the most Brazilian basketball championships

Nossa Liga de Basquete (unofficial)
During the 2005–06 season, the Campeonato Nacional de Basquete, which was organized by the Brazilian Basketball Confederation (CBB), was cancelled due to a legal dispute between the CBB and the Nossa Liga de Basquetebol (NLB). Winner/Limeira was the champion of the competition that was organized by the NLB. The NLB was led by the former player Oscar Schmidt.

See also
New Basket Brazil (NBB)
São Paulo State Championship
Rio de Janeiro State Championship

References

External links
New Basketball Brazil 
Basketball Brazil official website  

Brasileiro de Basquete
Defunct basketball leagues
Professional sports leagues in Brazil